Mary Ann Byrne (9 September 1854 – 4 November 1894) was an Irish nationalist.

Biography
Mary Ann Byrne was born Mary Ann Moneypenny on Haddington Road, Dublin on 9 September 1854. She was the second daughter of a plasterer, Arthur Moneypenny and his wife, Frances (née Kelly). She married Frank Byrne in St Mary's Catholic Church, Dukinfield, Ashton-under-Lyne on 9 September 1876, with both living in Peel Street, Dukinfield, at the time. Committed to the Irish nationalist cause, she delivered the surgical knives used in the assassinations of the Permanent Under Secretary Thomas Henry Burke and the newly installed Chief Secretary for Ireland, Lord Frederick Cavendish (the Phoenix Park Murders), to the Irish National Invincibles in February 1882 when she was seven months pregnant, concealing the knives under her skirts. On one other occasion, she delivered two revolvers, a rifle and a large amount of ammunition to other Invincibles.

The evidence of James Carey implicated Byrne in the Phoenix Park Murders, leading to her arrest at her home on Avondale Road, Peckham Rye, south London in February 1883. However, Carey would not positively identify her in court as the woman who delivered the arms. Following this, she was released. A few weeks later she traveled to America to join her husband there. At a meeting in New York to honour the executed Invincibles in May 1885, she was presented with a "well-filled purse" and pronounced a "brave little woman" who was "as true as steel to all those heroic ideas of womanhood which typify the feminine character of Ireland." She became a member of an American ladies’ committee which erected a monument to Patrick O’Donnell, executed for killing James Carey, in Glasnevin in April 1887.

Byrne developed paralysis three years before the death of her husband in 1894. Believing she was near death, she told an American journalist that Parnell was unconnected to the Invincibles in June 1894. She died on 4 November 1894, and was buried with her husband Old Saint Marys Cemetery, Rhode Island.

References

1854 births
1894 deaths
People from Dublin (city)
Irish nationalists
Irish rebels
Irish republicans
Irish revolutionaries